La Vergne may refer to:

 La Vergne, Charente-Maritime, a commune in the Charente-Maritime département in France
 La Vergne, Tennessee, a city in Rutherford County, Tennessee, United States
 La Vergne High School, a public high school within the city
 La Vergne (Metra), a commuter rail station in Berwyn, Illinois

See also 
 Lavergne (disambiguation)